Hypatopa styga is a moth in the family Blastobasidae. It is found in Costa Rica.

The length of the forewings is about 5 mm. The forewings are pale brown intermixed with brownish-orange and brown scales. The hindwings are translucent pale brown, gradually darkening towards the apex.

Etymology
The specific name is derived from the mythical river Styx (a river that separates the world of the living from the world of the dead in Greek mythology).

References

Moths described in 2013
Hypatopa